Pseudoglutamicibacter cumminsii is a species of Gram-positive bacteria.

References

Further reading

Sneath, Peter HA, et al. Bergey's manual of systematic bacteriology. Volume 5. Williams & Wilkins, 1986.

External links

LPSN
Type strain of Arthrobacter cumminsii at BacDive -  the Bacterial Diversity Metadatabase

Micrococcaceae
Psychrophiles
Bacteria described in 1997